Carroll Curtis Widdoes (December 3, 1903 – September 22, 1971) was an American college football coach and athletics administrator. He served as the head football coach at Ohio State University (1944–1945) and Ohio University (1949–1957), compiling a career head coaching record of 58–38–5. Widdoes's 1944 Ohio State team went undefeated and was retroactively named national champion by the National Championship Foundation and the Sagarin Ratings.

Early life
Widdoes was the son of the Rev. and Mrs. Howard W. Widdoes. The Widdoes were missionaries to the Philippines for the United Brethren Church, a predecessor denomination of the United Methodist Church, and Carroll was born there in 1903. Carroll and his brothers and sister came to live at Otterbein in 1916.

Coaching career
After graduating from Otterbein College in Westerville, Ohio in 1926, Widdoes was an assistant football coach under Paul Brown at Massillon Washington High School in Massillon, Ohio. He followed Brown to Ohio State University as an assistant and assumed the head coaching job in 1944 when Brown joined the Navy, leading the Buckeyes to an undefeated season. That season, he coached Ohio State's first Heisman Trophy winner, Les Horvath. In two seasons at Ohio State, Widdoes posted a 16–2 record. After the 1945 season, Widdoes left Ohio State, choosing his offensive coordinator, Paul Bixler, to be his successor.

Widdoes took over as head football coach at Ohio University in 1949, eventually becoming athletic director as well. In nine seasons as head coach, he led the Bobcats to a 42–36–5 record and a Mid-American Conference title in 1953.

Later life and death
Widdoes retired in 1969 and moved to Lake Worth, Florida. He died at his home there on September 22, 1971.

Head coaching record

References

1903 births
1971 deaths
Ohio Bobcats athletic directors
Ohio Bobcats football coaches
Ohio State Buckeyes football coaches
Otterbein University alumni
People from Lake Worth Beach, Florida
American people in the American Philippines